Les Yvris–Noisy-le-Grand is a French railway station located at kilometric point 23.843 of the Paris-Est–Mulhouse-Ville railway, on branch E4 of RER E, in Noisy-le-Grand, Seine-Saint-Denis, Île-de-France.

The station 
Opened on Paris–Bâle railway, the station is named after a district of Noisy-le-Grand. It has been served since 14 December 2003 by RER E trains bound to Tournan. It was so far served by suburban trains from Paris-Est.

Service 
The station is served in both directions by one train every 30 minutes at off-peak times and in the evening, and by 2 to 4 trains an hour during peak hours. More than 45 trains a day serving the station travel towards Haussmann–Saint Lazare, while 44 travel towards Tournan.

Connections 
RATP Group bus lines 310, 312 and 320 serve the station.

Traffic 
In 2006, around 1 000 people a day entered the station. It is less busy than Noisy-le-Grand–Mont d'Est and Noisy–Champs, served by RER A.

Notes and references

External links 
 

Réseau Express Régional stations
Railway stations in Seine-Saint-Denis